Tadeusz Gajl (born 1940 in Vilnius, Lithuania) is a Lithuanian-born Polish artist and graphic designer, notable for his contemporary illustrations on the coats of arms borne by the historical nobility (szlachta) of Poland.

After graduating from the Academy of Fine Arts in Łódź in 1966, he worked as a design specialist for the textile industry in Walim (1965-1966) and in Białystok (1966-1974). Between 1975 and the martial law in Poland of 1981 he worked as head of graphics for the "Kontrasty" monthly, editor-in-chief and graphics for the weekly "Plus" (1989-1990). In 1990 he was also one of the co-founders of "Tygodnik Białostocki", a Białystok-based local weekly. He has also authored the graphical and artistic finish of numerous books of various Polish publishing houses.

Since 1983 Gajl became interested in Polish heraldry. For two of his books detailing the coats of arms of the nobility in the former Polish–Lithuanian Commonwealth he prepared more than 4500 illustrations. He is also the author of modern emblems adopted by, among others, the city of Białystok and Podlaskie Voivodship.

See also
 Polish heraldry

References

External links
 Ornatowski.com: https://web.archive.org/web/20060507135335/http://www.ornatowski.com/index/herbyszlacheckie_g.htm
 Wyszukiwarka herbów szlachty polskiej: http://gajl.wielcy.pl/

Living people
1940 births
Artists from Białystok
Polish heraldists
Artists from Vilnius
Soviet emigrants to Poland